Tommy Laurendine (born c. 1968) is an American football coach. He is currently the offensive coordinator at Mississippi College. Laurendine served as the head football coach at Sewanee: The University of the South from 2011 to 2016.  He previously served as an offensive coordinator at Washington and Lee University, the University of West Alabama, Southern Arkansas University, Lenoir–Rhyne University and The Citadel, The Military College of South Carolina. Laurendine was hired as Sewanee's 30th head coach on April 7, 2011. He resigned from his position at Sewanee in February 2017. On January 12, 2018, Laurendine was named offensive coordinator for the Mississippi College Choctaws.

Head coaching record

References

External links
 Mississippi College profile
 Sewanee profile

1960s births
Living people
American football quarterbacks
Lenoir–Rhyne Bears football coaches
Lenoir–Rhyne Bears football players
Mississippi College Choctaws football coaches
Sewanee Tigers football coaches
Southern Arkansas Muleriders football coaches
The Citadel Bulldogs football coaches
Washington and Lee Generals football coaches
West Alabama Tigers football coaches
West Georgia Wolves football coaches
High school football coaches in Georgia (U.S. state)
People from Oak Ridge, Tennessee